The 2018 Huntingdonshire District Council election took place on 3 May 2018 to elect members of Huntingdonshire District Council in England. This was on the same day as other local elections.

Ward results

Alconbury

Brampton

Buckden

Fenstanton

Godmanchester and Hemingford Abbots

Great Paxton

Great Staughton

Hemingford Grey and Houghton

Holywell-cum-Needingworth

Huntingdon East

Huntingdon North

Kimbolton

Ramsey

Sawtry

Somersham

St Ives East

St Ives South

St Ives West

St Neots East

St Neots Eaton

St Neots Eynesbury

St Neots Priory Park and Little Paxton

Stilton, Folksworth and Washingley

The Stukeleys

Warboys

Yaxley

By-elections

Godmanchester & Hemingford Abbots by-election
A by-election took place in Godmanchester and Hemingford Abbots on 1 August 2019 after the resignation of Liberal Democrat councillor David Underwood. The seat was held for the Liberal Democrats by Sarah Wilson.

Alconbury by-election
A by-election took place in Alconbury on 12 December 2019 alongside the 2019 general election, following the resignation of Councillor Jim White. The seat was held for the Conservative Party by Ian Gardener.

St Ives East by-election
A by-election took place in the St Ives East ward on 13 February 2020, after the resignation of Conservative Party Councillor and Cambridgeshire Police and Crime Commissioner Jason Ablewhite following his referral to the Independent Office for Police Conduct. The seat was held for the Conservative Party by Adam Roberts.

Huntingdon North by-election
A by-election took place in the Huntingdon North ward on 6 May 2021 alongside the 2021 local elections. The seat was held for the Labour Party by Marion Kadewere.

St Ives South by-election
A by-election took place in the St Ives South ward on 6 May 2021 alongside the 2021 local elections, following the passing of Councillor John Davies. The seat was held for the Conservative Party by Rianna D'Souza.

St Ives East by-election
A by-election took place in the St Ives East ward on 6 May 2021 alongside the 2021 local elections, following the resignation of Councillor Richard Bellamy. The seat was held for the Conservative Party by Craig Smith.

Warboys by-election
A by-election took place in the Warboys ward on 6 May 2021 alongside the 2021 local elections, following the passing of Councillor Jill Tavener. The seat was held for the Conservative Party by Michael Haines.

St Neots East by-election
A by-election took place in the St Neots East ward on 8 July 2021, following the election of Dr Nik Johnson as Mayor of Cambridgeshire and Peterborough. The seat was won by Independent candidate Benjamin Pitt.

Huntingdon East by-election

References 

May 2018 events in the United Kingdom
Huntingdonshire District Council elections
2018 English local elections